The Westpoint is a skyscraper located in the Sai Ying Pun district of Hong Kong. The building was completed in 1999. It was designed by architectural firm Ho & Partners Architects, and was constructed by Chun Wo Construction & Engineering. The Westpoint, which stands as the 84th-tallest building in Hong Kong, is composed entirely of office space. The building is architecturally unique due to its ball structure that adorns the roof; the ball is home to a private club.

The building was originally meant to serve as the headquarters of the Chinese state-owned corporation China Merchants Group, but was sold to the Liaison Office of the Central People's Government in the Hong Kong Special Administrative Region in the early 2000s. The entire building is occupied by this office and the ground level is heavily fortified and protected by security. The top level houses the director's office, a clubhouse, and a grand ballroom. Other features of the building include a gym, a conference centre, banquet facilities, exhibition space, and a beauty salon with barbers from mainland China.

See also
List of tallest buildings in Hong Kong

References

Skyscraper office buildings in Hong Kong
Office buildings completed in 1999
1999 establishments in Hong Kong
Sai Ying Pun